Pardee is a ghost town in Atchison County, Kansas, United States.

History
Pardee was platted in 1857, and named for Pardee Butler, a local reverend and abolitionist. A post office was established at Pardee in 1858, and remained in operation until it was discontinued in 1903.

References

Further reading

External links
 Atchison County maps: Current, Historic, KDOT

Geography of Atchison County, Kansas
Ghost towns in Kansas
1857 establishments in Kansas Territory